The Chosen One is a 1982 Soviet drama film directed by Sergey Solovyev.

Plot 
The film takes place during the Second World War. The film tells about a rich German baron who despises the Nazi ideology, but at the same time tries to maintain neutrality. At the end of the war he nails off to Colombia and conducts a dubious financial operation there.

Cast 
 Leonid Filatov as Mister B.K.
 Tatyana Drubich
 Amparo Grisales
 Raúl Cervántes
 Santiago García
 Carl West

References

External links 
 

1982 films
1980s Russian-language films
Soviet drama films
1982 drama films